Chief of the Defence Force may refer to:

 Chief of the Defence Force (Australia)
 Chief of the Defence Staff (Canada)
 Chief of Defence Forces (Kenya)
 Chief of Defence Forces (Malaysia)
 Chief of Defence Force (Maldives)
 Chief of the Defence Force (Namibia)
 Chief of Defence Force (New Zealand)
 Chief of Defence Force (Singapore)
 Chief of Defence Forces (Thailand)
 Chief of Defence Forces (Uganda)

See also
Defence Force (disambiguation)
Chief of defence
Chief of the Defence Staff (disambiguation)